Grais is a genus of  skipper butterflies in the family Hesperiidae. It is monotypic, with the only species, Grais stigmaticus, commonly known as the hermit skipper, found from the south-western US (Texas) to Argentina, and Jamaica in the Caribbean

References

Taxa named by Frederick DuCane Godman
Taxa named by Osbert Salvin